Scopula kounden is a moth of the family Geometridae. It was described by Claude Herbulot in 1992. It is endemic to Cameroon.

References

Moths described in 1992
kounden
Endemic fauna of Cameroon
Moths of Africa
Taxa named by Claude Herbulot